SILAM (System for Integrated Modeling of Atmospheric Composition) is a global-to-meso-scale atmospheric dispersion model developed by the Finnish Meteorological Institute (FMI). It provides information on atmospheric composition, air quality, and wildfire smoke (PM2.5) and is also able to solve the inverse dispersion problem. It can take data from a variety of sources, including natural ones such as sea salt, blown dust, and pollen.

The FMI provides three datasets based on SILAM: a 4-day global air pollutant (SO2, NO, NO2, O3, PM2.5, and PM10) forecast based on TNO-MACC (global emission) and IS4FIRES (wildfire), a 5-day global wildfire smoke forecast based on IS4FIRES, and a 5-day pollen forecast for Europe.

References 

Atmospheric dispersion modeling
Air pollution